James Norris, D.D. (27 June 1797, in Warblington – 16 April 1872, in Oxford) was an Oxford college head in the 19th century.

Norris was educated at Trinity College, Oxford. He was President of Corpus Christi College, Oxford, from 1843 until his death.

References

1797 births
1872 deaths
Alumni of Trinity College, Oxford
Presidents of Corpus Christi College, Oxford
Category:People from Warblington